John Hayward (1819 – March 13, 1885) was a lawyer, judge and politician in Newfoundland. He served in the Newfoundland House of Assembly from 1852 to 1866.

He was born and educated in Harbour Grace. He studied law with George Henry Emerson and was called to the Newfoundland bar in 1841. He served as chief clerk and registrar for the northern circuit court and as sub-collector of customs at Harbour Grace.

In 1849, John and his young family headed for Washington County in Wisconsin. They traveled during a week and a half. They took a boat from Newfoundland to New York, then up the canals to Albany, another boat to Buffalo. They traveled to Wisconsin by wagon and bought a farm and had land cleared. After a few months, in a letter to his father-in-law, he seems full of optimism. In spite of that, he was back in Harbour Grace at the end of 1850, and was sub-collector of Customs in 1851.

He was elected to the assembly for Conception Bay in 1852 and for Harbour Grace in 1855 and again in 1859. He served as Solicitor General in the provincial cabinet until 1861. The results of the 1861 election in Harbour Grace were set aside due to violence at the polls; Hayward was re-elected in a by-election held later that year. He was elected again in 1865 and was named Solicitor General again. Hayward was opposed to the union with Canada proposed in 1866. He retired from politics in August of that year and was named an assistant justice in the Supreme Court of Newfoundland. Hayward retired from the bench due to illness in 1884 and died the following year.

References 

Members of the Newfoundland and Labrador House of Assembly
1885 deaths
1819 births
Newfoundland Colony judges
People from Harbour Grace